The 1995 Uncensored was the inaugural Uncensored professional wrestling pay-per-view (PPV) event produced by World Championship Wrestling (WCW). It took place on March 19, 1995 from the Tupelo Coliseum in Tupelo, Mississippi. As of 2014 the event is available on the WWE Network.

Storylines
The event featured professional wrestling matches that involve different wrestlers from pre-existing scripted feuds and storylines. Professional wrestlers portray villains, heroes, or less distinguishable characters in the scripted events that build tension and culminate in a wrestling match or series of matches.

Event

All of the pre-pay-per-view matches were broadcast live on WCW Main Event. The "King of the Road" match  took place in the caged-off trailer of the Blacktop Bully's 18-wheeler truck, as it was driven (supposedly) around nearby roads. The object of the match was to climb to the top of the trailer's cage and sound a horn positioned there. Bully sounded the horn to win. This match was taped days earlier outside of Atlanta, Georgia and was heavily edited due to WCW's strict no-bleeding policy in place at the time; Dustin Rhodes and Bully were subsequently fired for blading during the match in violation of the policy.

The "Boxer vs. Wrestler" match between Johnny B. Badd and Arn Anderson was billed as having ten three-minute rounds, with a rest period of one minute between rounds. Anderson's WCW World Television Championship was not on the line. The rules stated that Anderson (as "the wrestler") could win by pinfall or submission, whereas Johnny B. Badd (as "the boxer") could only win by knockout. Johnny won the match during round 4 at the twenty-two second mark.

Despite the event being billed as "no rules" the Avalanche was disqualified in his match against Randy Savage after a "fan" attacked Savage. The fan turned out to be Ric Flair dressed like a woman.

The Falls Count Anywhere Texas Tornado Tag Team match between The Nasty Boys and Harlem Heat ended up in the concession stands, where the participants attacked each other with cotton candy, soft drinks and other nearby objects. Harlem Heat's WCW World Tag Team Championship was not on the line in that match.

Before the PPV Hulk Hogan's manager Jimmy Hart was kidnapped and tied up at an undisclosed location by Vader and Flair. During the match Hart escaped and joined The Renegade at ringside. During the match a masked man appeared and attacked Renegade, before returning to the back. Hogan was given the win over Vader when he dragged an interfering Ric Flair and touched all four turnbuckles (despite Flair not being the legal opponent in the match). After the match, a masked man appeared again, seemingly siding with Vader and Flair, before unmasking to reveal himself as Randy Savage and embracing Hogan, Renegade and Hart. Savage had tied up the first masked man backstage, who was then revealed to be Arn Anderson. Hogan's WCW World Heavyweight Championship was not on the line in the match

Results

References

Professional wrestling in Mississippi
Events in Mississippi
1995 in Mississippi
WCW Uncensored
March 1995 events in the United States
1995 World Championship Wrestling pay-per-view events
Wrestling Observer Newsletter award winners